Henry Cameron may refer to:

Henry Alvin Cameron (1872–1918), African-American schoolteacher and u.S. Army officer
Henry Fairfax, 4th Lord Fairfax of Cameron (1707–1793), Scottish nobleman, peer, and politician
Henry Cameron (footballer) (born 1997), New Zealand international football player

See also
Harry Cameron (disambiguation)